Gesnouinia arborea,, is a shrub or small tree.

Description
Leaves entire, acuminate, 3-nerved, pubescent, stipules absent. Flowers monoecious, 1 female and 2 male in each involucre. Involucres clustered into a dense panicle. Male flowers with 4-partite calyx and 4 stamens. Female flowers with included ovary and short styles. Seeds (achenes) enclosed by the calyx.

Distribution
In Tenerife found in laurel forest zone of Sierra Anaga, Las Mercedes, Vueltas de Taganana, 600–800 m, Icod el Alto and Barranco del Agua near Los Silos, rare. In La Palma found in Laurel woods at Los Tiles, Cubo de la Galga, Cumbre Nueva and Barlovento. In La Gomera found in El Cedro forest, Roque de Agando and Chorros de Epina, 600–1000 m. In El Hierro found in Forests of El Golfo. In Gran Canaria found in Los Tiles de Moya, Barranco de la Virgen and Osorio, rare.

References

Gallery

External links
 http://www.arbolesornamentales.es/Gesnouiniaarborea.htm
 http://www.floradecanarias.com/gesnouinia_arborea.html
 http://jardin-mundani.blogspot.no/2012/12/gesnouinia-arborea-la-canaria-mas.html
 http://plantasdemitierra.blogspot.no/2007/09/gesnouinia-arborea.html
 http://www.stridvall.se/flowers/gallery/Urticaceae/NIKA9046
 http://www.stridvall.se/flowers/gallery/Urticaceae/NIKA8272
 http://botany.cz/cs/gesnouinia-arborea/
 http://www.pharmakobotanik.de/systematik/7_bilder/canarias/tf060876.jpg
 http://www.pharmakobotanik.de/systematik/7_bilder/canarias/tf060878.jpg
 http://www.pharmakobotanik.de/systematik/7_bilder/canarias/tf060881.jpg
 http://www.magrama.gob.es/es/biodiversidad/temas/inventarios-nacionales/09047122801a3345_tcm7-22183.pdf

Urticaceae
Endemic flora of the Canary Islands
Endemic flora of Macaronesia